7z is a data compression and archival file format.

7z, 7Z, or 7-Z may also  refer to:

7-Zip, an open source file archive software for 7z and other formats
Clerget 7Z, a seven-cylinder rotary aircraft engine 
The IATA code for former airline Halcyonair
The IATA code for current airline Ameristar Jet Charter

See also
Z7 (disambiguation)